Achots was a region and a family of the old Armenia c. 400–800.

The ruler c. 430 was Hemaiak Achotsi, and c. 445 Hrarat Achotsi.

See also
List of regions of old Armenia

Early medieval Armenian regions